Khordeh Qeshlaq may refer to:
 Khordeh Qeshlaq, Ardabil
 Khordeh Qeshlaq, East Azerbaijan